Kacey Lee Bellamy (born April 22, 1987) is an American ice hockey defender for the Calgary section of the PWHPA, an Olympic Silver medalist, and seven-time IIHF World Women's Championship winner.  She currently plays for the Boston Pride in the National Women's Hockey League and the United States women's national ice hockey team. She won the Isobel Cup with the Pride and is a two-time Clarkson Cup champion with the Boston Blades of the Canadian Women's Hockey League.

Early life and college
Bellamy grew up in Westfield, Massachusetts, and spent four years in Sheffield, Massachusetts at the Berkshire School and graduated in 2005, where she lettered in hockey, field hockey and softball. In her senior year, she was named team MVP and co-MVP of the New England Prep School Athletic Council Division I. She finished her hockey career with 30 goals and 80 assists. She was Berkshire's Female Athlete of the Year as a junior and senior.

In 2009, Bellamy graduated from the University of New Hampshire with a bachelor's degree in women's studies.

New Hampshire Wildcats
Bellamy ranks third all-time at UNH in career points by a defenseman. As a Freshman, she led New Hampshire Blueliners in goals (9) and was second in both assists (16) and points (24). In her sophomore season, she ranked second among team defensemen and 10th among the nation's blueliners with 29 points (10 goals, 19 assists). In 2007–08 (junior year), she led all Wildcat defensemen with 26 points (3 goals, 23 assists) and ranked 10th in the nation with .74 points per game. In her senior year, (2008–09), she ranked fourth among NCAA Blueliners with 28 points (6 goals. 22 assists) in 35 games en route to being named to the RBK All-America First Team.

Professional career

USA Hockey
Bellamy is a two-time USA Hockey Player Development Camp attendee (2004–05). From 2006 to 2009, she was a four-time USA Hockey Women's National Festival participant. In addition, she was a two-time member of the United States Women's Under-22 Select Team. She was part of the United States Women's Select Team for the Four Nations Cup that finished first in 2008. She also played for the team when they had second-place finishes in 2006 and 2007. Bellamy was part of seven gold medal winning squads for the United States Women's National Team for the International Ice Hockey Federation World Women's Championship: 2008, 2009, 2011, 2013, 2015, 2016, 2017. For 2009 and 2015, she was named one of Team USA's top-three players. For 2017 Bellamy scored 2 goals in the IIHF world championship gold medal game against team Canada and was named US player of the game.  She served as alternate captain for USA world championship teams in 2013, 2016, 2017, 2019 and 2021. Bellamy announced her retirement from USA Hockey in September 2021 after her heartbreaking loss to Team Canada in a gold medal game in 2021 IIHF Women's World Championship. She settled for Silver for the first time since 2012 and in her last hockey career.

Boston Blades
As a member of the Boston Blades, Bellamy was part of the club's first two Clarkson Cup triumphs; in 2013 and 2015. In addition, Bellamy participated in the 2014 CWHL All-Star Game.

Boston Pride
On September 22, 2015, it was announced that Bellamy had signed a contract with the Boston Pride of the National Women's Hockey League. In the Pride's inaugural match, a 4–1 win against the Buffalo Beauts, Kacey Bellamy would earn two assists, becoming the first blueliner in NWHL history to log a multi-point game.

Calgary Inferno
On July 24, 2018, Bellamy and fellow Team USA silver medalist Brianna Decker signed as free agents with the Calgary Inferno. Appearing in the 2019 Clarkson Cup Finals, Bellamy logged the assist on the game-winning goal, scored by Decker.

Awards and honors

USA Hockey
Two-time member of the U.S. Women's National Team for the International Ice Hockey Federation World Women's Championship (gold-2008–09)
Named one of Team USA's top-three players in 2009
Three-time member of the U.S. Women's Select Team for the Four Nations Cup (1st-2008, 2nd-2006–07)
Two-time member of the U.S. Women's Under-22 Select Team for the Under-22 Series with Canada (2007–08). Led U.S. defensemen with two points (1–1) in 2008. Paced the team with four points (1–3) in 2007
Four-time USA Hockey Women's National Festival participant (2006–09)
Two-time USA Hockey Player Development Camp attendee (2004–05).

NCAA
Played four years at the University of New Hampshire of Hockey East
Ranks third all-time at UNH in career points by a defenseman. As a Senior (2008–09): Ranked fourth among NCAA blueliners with 28 points (6–22) in 35 games en route to being named to the RBK All-America First Team
Garnered Hockey East First Team All-Star honors and was named the Hockey East Tournament MVP, as well as earning a spot on the Hockey East All-Tournament Team
Named UNH's Jim Urquhart Student-Athlete of the Year. As a Junior (2007–08): Hockey East Second Team All-Star
Led all Wildcat defensemen with 26 points (3–23) and ranked 10th in the nation with .74 points per game. As a Sophomore (2006–07): Hockey East Second Team All-Star
Named to the Hockey East RBK/CCM All-Tournament Team
Ranked second among team defensemen and 10th among the nation's blueliners with 29 points (10–19). As a Freshman (2005–06): Named to the All-USCHO Rookie Team and the Hockey East RBK/CCM All-Tournament Team
Led UNH blueliners in goals (8) and was second in both assists (16) and points (24).

NCAA honors
All-USCHO Rookie Team, 2006
Hockey East RBK/CCM All-Tournament Team, 2006
Hockey East Second Team All-Star, 2007
Hockey East RBK/CCM All-Tournament Team, 2007
Hockey East Second Team All-Star, 2008
RBK All-America First Team, 2009
Hockey East First Team All-Star honors, 2009
Hockey East Tournament MVP, 2009
Hockey East All-Tournament Team, 2009
UNH's Jim Urquhart Student-Athlete of the Year, 2009
Best Defender, 2011 4 Nations Cup
Hockey East 10th Anniversary Team selection

CWHL
 Third Star of the Game, 2019 Clarkson Cup

Family life
Bellamy has two brothers, Rob and Corey, and one sister, Lindsey. Her brothers are also hockey players with Rob having played hockey at the University of Maine and was drafted by Philadelphia Flyers while Corey has skated for teams in the ECHL, Federal Hockey League, and Southern Professional Hockey League, following one season of collegiate hockey at Becker College. She is also a cousin of former Indianapolis Colts safety Jamie Silva.

Career statistics

Club

International

References

External links

Kacey Bellamy at UNH Wildcats

Kacey Bellamy at USA Hockey

1987 births
Living people
American expatriate ice hockey players in Canada
American women's ice hockey defensemen
Berkshire School alumni
Boston Blades players
Boston Pride players
Calgary Inferno players
Clarkson Cup champions
Ice hockey players from Massachusetts
Ice hockey players at the 2010 Winter Olympics
Ice hockey players at the 2014 Winter Olympics
Ice hockey players at the 2018 Winter Olympics
Isobel Cup champions
Medalists at the 2010 Winter Olympics
Medalists at the 2014 Winter Olympics
Medalists at the 2018 Winter Olympics
New Hampshire Wildcats women's ice hockey players
Olympic silver medalists for the United States in ice hockey
People from Westfield, Massachusetts
Professional Women's Hockey Players Association players